Vincent van Gogh painted A Road at Saint-Remy with Female Figure while staying in Saint-Remy in 1889. The distinctive painting style of Van Gogh's later works is very apparent in this painting as the road, vegetation and sky is all rendered with his thick characteristic brush strokes.

The painting depicts a woman walking towards a house at the end of a small road at Saint-Remy in France. The sides of the road is covered in green and yellow vegetation as fall has set in, and the fall also seems to have brought its winds. There is some contrast between the windy yellow and green vegetation which dominates the female figure, and the blue open sky overhead.

Paintings by Vincent van Gogh
Paintings of Saint-Rémy-de-Provence by Vincent van Gogh
1889 paintings
Paintings in Japan
Paintings of women